Choi Kyoung-sik (born 24 September 1966) is a South Korean para table tennis coach and former player. He has won five medals in three Paralympic Games (2000, 2004, and 2008). 

He has been coaching the national team since his retirement.

References 

1966 births
Living people
Table tennis players at the 2004 Summer Paralympics
Table tennis players at the 2008 Summer Paralympics
Table tennis players at the 2000 Summer Paralympics
Medalists at the 2008 Summer Paralympics
Medalists at the 2004 Summer Paralympics
Medalists at the 2000 Summer Paralympics
South Korean male table tennis players
Paralympic gold medalists for South Korea
Paralympic silver medalists for South Korea
Paralympic bronze medalists for South Korea
Paralympic table tennis players of South Korea
Sportspeople from South Gyeongsang Province
People from Changnyeong County
Paralympic medalists in table tennis
South Korean table tennis coaches
21st-century South Korean people